World Mime Day is a worldwide initiative of the World Mime Organisation to celebrate the Art of Mime and non-verbal communication on March 22 the day of birth of legendary french mime artist Marcel Marceau. It is being celebrated since 2011 in more and more countries each year on four continents. World Mime Day is not officially recognized by UNESCO.

Initiators 
 Marko Stojanović, a mime artist from Serbia and president of the World Mime Organisation.
 Ofer Blum, a mime artist from Israel and vice-president of the World Mime Organisation.
 Jean Bernard Laclotte, a mime artist from France.

All three of them are former students of Marcel Marceau.

History 
World Mime Day is one of those ideas that occur on different sides of the planet in almost the same time and it should belong to all humanity. The three initiators are probably not the only people that thought of establishing the World Mime Day under this or any other name/title.

In 1998 Israeli mime artist Ofer Blum came to Serbia, at that time still called Yugoslavia for a short tour organised by Marko Stojanovic, his friend and classmate from Marcel Marceau International Mime School in Paris. It is than that Blum and Stojanovic first spoke about establishing a World Mime Organisation, not yet under that name and a World Mime Day or as they called it at that time "International Day of Mime".
Marcel Marceau was still alive, so was his school but unfortunately Blum and Stojanovic were not aware of the seriousness of their ideas and they were also preoccupied with their careers.
It was only in 2004 that World Mime Organisation was officially registered as a Non-Governmental and Non-Profit organisation in Serbia, where the paperwork was the easiest and the World Mime Day idea was back "on the table" (where it stayed till 2011).
In 2007, Marceau died and again Blum and Stojanovic came back to the idea of establishing the World Mime Day to celebrate the day when Marceau was born - March 22.

In April 2011 Jean Bernard Laclotte has sent an e-mail to Stojanovic with the same idea and a developed concept of the "Journée Mondiale du Mime" except that he wanted to mark the day when Marceau died 22 September. Thanks to Laclotte’s initiative "Journée Mondiale du Mime" was celebrated in several countries around the world on September 22, 2011. World Mime Day is celebrated on March 22 in most of the countries but there are still few countries, especially in South America celebrating it on 22 September.

World Mime Organisation recognises "Journée Mondiale du Mime 2011" as the first World Mime Day celebrated.

Celebrations 
World Mime Day is celebrated in different ways in different countries These are some examples:
Serbia, North Macedonia, Bulgaria, Armenia - Local Wikipedia Chapters with the World Mime Organisation and local mime organizations - World Mime Day Wiki edit-a-thon
Armenia - Yerevan State Pantomime Theatre - Shows
Georgia - Georgian State Pantomime Theatre - Flash mob in the city of Tbilisi
Bangladesh - Bangladesh Mime Federation - National Mime Fest
Indonesia - Free Mime Shows
Poland - Warszawskie Centrum Pantomimy & portal PantomimaPolska.pl - video screenings, book promotions, public discussions
Slovakia - Divadlo Komika - shows
India - Mime Art & Culture - Artists performing in schools and colleges
United States - Mime Thatre Studio - workshops

References

External links 
World Mime Organisation

Mime
Theatre
Pantomime